Hajira is a small town in Poonch District of Azad Kashmir, Pakistan. It is the headquarters of Tehsil Hajira also known as 'Cheara' in local accents. Hajira is a transport hub, being the center point of different districts. Hajira Ponch is correctly interpreted as ‘Hajira Reach’. In front (South) of Hajira there is district Sudhnoti. On the left side (South East) of Hajira there is district Kotli. On the back side (North) of Hajira there is district 'Haveli. District Bagh is in the right side (West) of Hajira. Khai Gala and Rawalakot are the other nearest cities of Hajira and located in the right side (West) of Hajira. While summers can be very hot (exceeding 35C) the winters are mild in Hajira, with snowfall very rare due to the low altitude. The language spoken in Hajira is Urdu similar to the right west side of Hajira as Rawlakot, as you go north to Tata pani towards Kotli and Mirpur the language emerges in to “Pahari” and “Potwari”. Hajira is close to Indian borders hence the main language becoming Urdu. The Indian borders and line of control LOC is near Hajira.

Location
'Hajira' Azad Kashmir is located at latitude 33° 46′ 18.12″ N, longitude 73° 73° 53′ 45.96″ E and an altitude of 3168 feet. The town is situated on the bank of a river (which feeds into the river Poonch) in a narrow small valley surrounded by hills. It is the nearest major town from the line of control and Indian controlled Kashmir, specifically Poonch. Hajira is one of four tehsils of Poonch district. It is a sub-divisional headquarter of Poonch district of Azad Kashmir. The main villages included in sub-division Hajira are: Ghameer, Pothi Chhaprian, Kathiara, Paghwati, Dawarandi, Tatrinote, Madarpur, Saher, Mandhol, Buttle, Sahra, Dara sher khan, Rakar, Sarari, Basari, Kaloti, Devigali, kalpur etc.
'Union Councils of Hajira':
There are six union councils of Tehsil Hajira  '1-Ghameer 2-Bahnteeni 3-Jandali 4-Serari 5-Raker 6-Phagwati'.

Facilities
Most amenities are available in Hajira. Health and Education institutes are located in the town. Hajira has transport linked with Rawalakot, Kotli and Trarkhel by road. Public transport runs daily between Rawalakot and Hajira from morning to night. Hotels and guest houses are located for tourists stay. The town is covered by all GSM operators. There are many markets in Hajira e.g. . 'Main Bazar Hajira' which remains 24 hours open, 'Serari Bazar', 'Dak-khaana Market', 'Thana Road Market', 'Pull Bazar', 'Bypass road market', 'College chowk Market', 'Petrol Pump Market''

Life in Hajira 
Hajira has a hot climate due to its low altitude but is a generally laid back town due to its mixed composition (Suddhan Pathans) Awans, Khwajas, Janjua Rajputs, Dullies, Jaats, Gujars, Ghakhars, Mughals, Qureshis, etc.). Due to its strategic position between Rawalakot, Kotli and Abbaspur it attracts people from all sectors for education and shopping. The people of Hajira and the surrounding areas have faced a lot of trouble in the past because of its proximity to the line of control between Indian and Pakistani administered Kashmir. Recently because of the Indo–Pak agreement , cross border attacks from India have been stopped and Hajira has become a safer town. The 2005 earthquake also caused some damage to the town, though far less than in Muzaffarabad and Bagh areas.

Education
There is a Government Boys Degree College and a Government Girls Degree College in Hajira as well as several private colleges in the town for example Muhammadan Science College ' Islamia Science College . Literacy rate of this town is almost 60% .

References

Populated places in Poonch District, Pakistan
Tehsils of Poonch District